Edward William Holly (1879–1973), born Edward William Ruthlavy, was a Major League Baseball shortstop. He played all or part of four seasons in the majors. He is also a member of the International League Hall of Fame.

In , he played for the St. Paul Saints. Holly played 150 games for St. Louis that year, batting .229. He was let go after the season.

In , Holly was back in the minor leagues, playing for the Rochester Bronchos of the Eastern League, the predecessor of the International League. He spent the next six seasons in that league, with the Bronchos, Montreal Royals, and Toronto Maple Leafs, where he built his reputation as a top defensive shortstop.

That year, Holly joined the Pittsburgh Rebels of the upstart Federal League. He served as their starting shortstop that year, batting .246 in 100 games. The next season, however, he was on the bench behind Marty Berghammer, who had jumped over from the Cincinnati Reds. After the season, the Federal League folded, and Holly retired as an active player.

He managed the club for three full seasons and parts of two others—including winning 96 games in —before being let go partway through the  season. He was also a long-time scout for several different major league teams.

References

Holly's page at the International League Hall of Fame

1879 births
1973 deaths
Baseball players from Chicago
Chicago Cubs scouts
Grand Rapids Boers players
Helena Senators players
Johnstown Johnnies players
Major League Baseball shortstops
Milwaukee Brewers (minor league) players
Milwaukee Creams players
Montreal Royals managers
Montreal Royals players
New Orleans Pelicans (baseball) players
Peoria Distillers players
Pittsburgh Rebels players
Rochester Bronchos players
St. Louis Cardinals players
St. Paul Saints (Western League) players
San Francisco (minor league baseball) players
Shreveport Pirates (baseball) players
Sportspeople from Chicago
Toronto Maple Leafs (International League) players
Washington Senators (1901–60) scouts